List of K-pop on the Billboard year-end charts is a compilation of chart information for K-pop music published by the Billboard charts, and reported on by Billboard K-Town, an online Billboard column. This is a list of K-pop musicians and bands and their placement, along with their musical releases, singles, EPs and albums on the Billboard Year-End charts.

2009–present
This list depends on continual updates taken from * and *.
 Charts with all updates 2009–present are marked (Complete).
Billboard artists comprehensive update incomplete.
Billboard charts comprehensive update incomplete.
The list is exclusive of Korea K-Pop Hot 100 data.
Figures in red highlight indicate the highest rating received by K-pop artists on that chart.
 – Current year's charting

Billboard 200 Albums (Year end) (Complete)

Billboard 200 Artists (Year end) (Complete)

Billboard 200 Artists - Duo/Group (Year end) (Complete)

Billboard Global 200 (Year end) (Complete)
 Chart started in 2021.

Billboard Global 200 Artists (Year end) (Complete)
 Chart started in 2021.

Billboard Global Excl. U.S. (Year end) (Complete)
 Chart started in 2021.

Billboard Global Excl. U.S. Artists (Year end) (Complete)
 Chart started in 2021.

Billboard Twitter Top Tracks (Year end) (Complete)
 Chart started 2014-12-31 and discontinued after 2017-12-31.

Boxscore Charts – Top 40 Tours (Year end)

Boxscore Charts – Top 25 Boxscores (Year end)

Boxscore Charts – Top Promoters (Year end)

Dance/Electronic Digital Song Sales (Year end) (Complete)

Digital Song Sales (Year end) (Complete)

Digital Song Sales Artists (Year end) (Complete)

Digital Song Sales Imprints (Year end) (Complete)

Digital Song Sales Labels (Year end) (Complete)

Google's Top Hummed Songs 2020 (presented by Google) (Year end) (Complete)
 Chart only for the year 2020

Hot 100 Artists (Year end) (Complete)

Hot 100 Songs (Year end) (Complete)

Hot Dance/Electronic Songs (Year end) (Complete)

Hot Singles Sales (Year end) (Complete)
 Chart started 2006-12-31 and discontinued.

Independent Albums (Year end) (Complete)

Independent Artists (Year end) (Complete)

Independent Imprints (Year end) (Complete)

Independent Labels (Year end) (Complete)

Internet Albums (Year end) (Complete)
Chart discontinued 2020.

Japan Hot 100 (Year end) (Complete)
 Chart started 2008-12-31

On-Demand Songs (On-Demand Streaming Songs) (Year end) (Complete)
 Chart not up yet or discontinued in 2021.

Radio Songs (Year end) (Complete)

Social 50 (Year end) (Complete)
 Chart halted from 2020-12-26 to present while under revisions.

Streaming Songs (Year end) (Complete)
 Chart started 2013-12-31.

Streaming Songs Artists (Year end) (Complete)
 Chart started 2013-12-31.

Tastemakers Albums (Year end) (Complete)

Top Album Sales (Year end) (Complete)
 Chart started 2015.

Top Album Sales Artists (Year end) (Complete)
Charts available 2002-2005 and 2015–present.

Top Album Sales Labels (Year end) (Complete)

Top Artists (Year end) (Complete)

Top Artists - Duo/Group (Year end) (Complete)

Top Current Albums (Year end)

Top New Artists (Year end) (Complete)

World Albums (Year end) (Complete)

World Albums Artists (Year end) (Complete)

World Albums Imprints (Year end) (Complete)

World Albums Labels (Year end) (Complete)

World Digital Song Sales (Year end) (Complete)
 Chart started 2010-12-31 and discontinued 2020.

World Digital Songs Artists (Year end) (Complete)
 Chart started 2010-12-31 and discontinued 2020.

See also
 List of K-pop on the Billboard charts
 List of K-pop albums on the Billboard charts
 List of K-pop songs on the Billboard charts
 Timeline of K-pop at Billboard
 Timeline of K-pop at Billboard in the 2020s
 Korea K-Pop Hot 100
 List of K-Pop concerts held outside Asia
 List of K-pop artists
 List of South Korean idol groups

References

External links
Billboard Year-End charts

Billboard charts
K-pop
South Korean music-related lists
2009 in South Korean music
2010 in South Korean music
2011 in South Korean music
2012 in South Korean music
2013 in South Korean music
2014 in South Korean music
2015 in South Korean music
2016 in South Korean music
2017 in South Korean music
2018 in South Korean music
2019 in South Korean music
2020 in South Korean music
2000s in South Korean music
2010s in South Korean music
2020s in South Korean music